The recycling of paper is the process by which waste paper is turned into new paper products. It has a number of important benefits: It saves waste paper from occupying homes of people and producing methane as it breaks down. Because paper fibre contains carbon (originally absorbed by the tree from which it was produced), recycling keeps the carbon locked up for longer and out of the atmosphere. Around two-thirds of all paper products in the US are now recovered and recycled, although it does not all become new paper. After repeated processing the fibres become too short for the production of new paper, which is why virgin fibre (from sustainably farmed trees) is frequently added to the pulp recipe.

There are three categories of paper that can be used as feedstocks for making recycled paper: mill broke, pre-consumer waste, and post-consumer waste. Mill broke is paper trimmings and other paper scrap from the manufacture of paper, and is recycled in a paper mill. Pre-consumer waste is a material which left the paper mill but was discarded before it was ready for consumer use. Post-consumer waste is material discarded after consumer use, such as old corrugated containers (OCC), old magazines, and newspapers. Paper suitable for recycling is called "scrap paper", often used to produce moulded pulp packaging. The industrial process of removing printing ink from paper fibres of recycled paper to make deinked pulp is called deinking, an invention of the German jurist Justus Claproth.

Process

The process of waste paper recycling most often involves mixing used/old paper with water and chemicals to break it down. It is then chopped up and heated, which breaks it down further into strands of cellulose, a type of organic plant material; this resulting mixture is called pulp, or slurry. It is strained through screens, which remove plastic (especially from plastic-coated paper) that may still be in the mixture. It is then cleaned, de-inked (ink is removed), bleached, and mixed with water. Then it can be made into new recycled paper.

The share of ink in a wastepaper stock is up to about 2% of the total weight.

Rationale for recycling
Industrialized paper making has an effect on the environment both upstream (where raw materials are acquired and processed) and downstream (waste-disposal impacts).

Today, 40% of paper pulp is created from wood (in most modern mills only 9–16% of pulp is made from pulp logs; the rest comes from waste wood that was traditionally burnt). Paper production accounts for about 35% of felled trees, and represents 1.2% of the world's total economic output. Recycling one ton of newsprint saves about 1 ton of wood while recycling 1 ton of printing or copier paper saves slightly more than 2 tons of wood. This is because kraft pulping requires twice as much wood since it removes lignin to produce higher quality fibres than mechanical pulping processes. Relating tons of paper recycled to the number of trees not cut is meaningless, since tree size varies tremendously and is the major factor in how much paper can be made from how many trees. In addition, trees raised specifically for pulp production account for 16% of world pulp production, old growth forests 9% and second- and third- and more generation forests account for the balance. Most pulp mill operators practice reforestation to ensure a continuing supply of trees. The Programme for the Endorsement of Forest Certification (PEFC) and the Forest Stewardship Council (FSC) certify paper made from trees harvested according to guidelines meant to ensure good forestry practices.

Energy
Energy consumption is reduced by recycling, although there is debate concerning the actual energy savings realized. The Energy Information Administration claims a 40% reduction in energy when paper is recycled versus paper made with unrecycled pulp, while the Bureau of International Recycling (BIR) claims a 64% reduction. This is enough electricity to power a 3-bedroom European house for an entire year, or enough energy to heat and air-condition the average North American home for almost six months. Recycling paper to make pulp actually consumes more fossil fuels than making new pulp via the kraft process; these mills generate most of their energy from burning waste wood (bark, roots, sawmill waste) and byproduct lignin (black liquor). Pulp mills producing new mechanical pulp use large amounts of energy; a very rough estimate of the electrical energy needed is 10 gigajoules per tonne of pulp (2500 kW·h per short ton).

Landfill use
About 35% of municipal solid waste (before recycling) in the United States by weight is paper and paper products. 42.4% of that is recycled.

Water and air pollution
The United States Environmental Protection Agency (EPA) has found that recycling causes 35% less water pollution and 74% less air pollution than making virgin paper. Pulp mills can be sources of both air and water pollution, especially if they are producing bleached pulp. Modern mills produce considerably less pollution than those of a few decades ago. Recycling paper provides an alternative fibre for papermaking. Recycled pulp can be bleached with the same chemicals used to bleach virgin pulp, but hydrogen peroxide and sodium hydrosulfite are the most common bleaching agents. Recycled pulp, or paper made from it, is known as PCF (process chlorine free) if no chlorine-containing compounds were used in the recycling process.

Greenhouse gas emissions
Studies on paper and cardboard production estimate the emissions of recycling paper to be 0.2 to 1.5 kg CO₂-equivalent/kg material. This is about 70% of the CO₂ emissions connected with production of virgin material.

Recycling statistics
In the mid-19th century, there was an increased demand for books and writing material. Up to that time, paper manufacturers had used discarded linen rags for paper, but supply could not keep up with the increased demand. Books were bought at auctions for the purpose of recycling fiber content into new paper, at least in the United Kingdom, by the beginning of the 19th century.

Internationally, about half of all recovered paper comes from converting losses (pre-consumer recycling), such as shavings and unsold periodicals; approximately one third comes from household or post-consumer waste.

Some statistics on paper consumption:
 1996: it was estimated that 95% of business information is still stored on paper.
 1993: although paper is traditionally identified with reading and writing, communications has now been replaced by packaging as the single largest category of paper use at 41% of all paper used.
 no date: 115 billion sheets of paper are used annually for personal computers. The average web user prints 16 pages daily.
 1997: on that year, 299,044 metric tons of paper was produced (including paperboard).
 1999: on that year, in the United States, the average consumption of paper per person was approximately 354 kilograms. This would be the same consumption for 6 people in Asia or 30 people in Africa.
 2006–2007: Australia 5.5 million tons of paper and cardboard was used with 2.5 million tons of this recycled.
 2009: Newspaper manufactured in Australia has 40% recycled content.

By region

European Union

Paper recycling in Europe has a long history. The industry self-initiative European Recovered Paper Council (ERPC) was set up in 2000 to monitor progress towards meeting the paper recycling targets set out in the 2000 European Declaration on Paper Recycling. Since then, the commitments in the Declaration have been renewed every five years. In 2011, the ERPC committed itself to meeting and maintaining both a voluntary recycling rate target of 70% in the then E-27, plus Switzerland and Norway by 2015, as well as qualitative targets in areas such as waste prevention, ecodesign and research and development. In 2014, the paper recycling rate in Europe was 71.7%, as stated in the 2014 Monitoring Report.

Japan
Municipal collections of paper for recycling are in place. However, according to the Yomiuri Shimbun, in 2008, eight paper manufacturers in Japan have admitted to intentionally mislabeling recycled paper products, exaggerating the amount of recycled paper used.

United States
Recycling has long been practiced in the United States. In 2012, paper and paperboard accounted for 68 million tons of municipal solid waste generated in the U.S., down from more than 87 million tons in 2000, according to the U.S. Environmental Protection Agency. While paper is the most commonly recycled material—64.6 percent was recovered in 2012—it is being used less overall than at the turn of the century. Paper accounts for more than a half of all recyclables collected in the US, by weight.

The history of paper recycling has several dates of importance:
 In 1690: The first paper mill to use recycled linen was established by the Rittenhouse family.
 In 1896: The first major recycling center was started by the Benedetto family in New York City, where they collected rags, newspaper, and trash with a pushcart.
 In 1993: The first year when more paper was recycled than was buried in landfills.

Today, over half of all paper used in the United States is collected and recycled. Paper products are still the largest component of municipal solid waste, making up more than 40% of the composition of landfills. In 2006, a record 53.4% of the paper used in the US (53.5 million tons) was recovered for recycling, up from a 1990 recovery rate of 33.5%.
The US paper industry set a goal of recovering 55 percent of all paper used in the US by 2012. Paper products used by the packaging industry were responsible for about 77% of packaging materials recycled, with more than 24 million pounds recovered in 2005.

By 1998, some 9,000 curbside recycling programs and 12,000 recyclable drop-off centers existed nationwide. As of 1999, 480 materials recovery facilities had been established to process the collected materials. Recently, junk mail has become a larger part of the overall recycling stream, compared to newspapers or personal letters. However, the increase in junk mail is still smaller compared to the declining use of paper from those sources.

In 2008, the global financial crisis caused the price of old newspapers to drop in the U.S. from $130 to $40 per short ton ($140/t to $45/t) in October.

India
The environmental impact due to excessive use of paper has negative effects on trees and forest.  Paper production utilizes nearly 40% of world's commercially cut timber. Millions of acres of forests are destroyed leading to deforestation disturbing the ecological balance. Many initiatives are being taken in India for recycling paper and reducing the hazards associated with it. Shree Aniruddha Upasana Foundation (Mumbai, India) is one such organization which undertakes used paper recycling projects. The foundation encourages using paper bags instead of plastic ones which again are a serious hazard to environment. They accept old newspapers, notebooks and so on and recycle the same into paper bags, teaching aids and toys for children.
 
The foundation also makes eco-friendly Lord Ganesh (a Hindu Deity) idols from paper pulp which are worshiped in Indian homes every year during Ganesh Chaturthi Festival (a Hindu Festival celebrated on birthday of Lord Ganesh). These paper recycling activities are carried out throughout the year by the volunteers of the foundation converting waste paper into "No Waste" 

In recent years, paper recycling has increased and Indian imports of waste paper have increased following stringent restrictions by China on waste imports. However, only 25-28 percent of local waste paper is recycled

Mexico

In Mexico, recycled paper, rather than wood pulp, is the principal feedstock in papermills accounting for about 75% of raw materials.

South Africa 
In 2018, South Africa recovered 1.285 million tonnes of recyclable paper products, putting the country's paper recovery rate at 71.7%. More than 90% of this recovered paper is used for the local beneficiation of new paper packaging and tissue.

Limitations and effects 
Along with fibres, paper can contain a variety of inorganic and organic constituents, including up to 10,000 different chemicals, which can potentially contaminate the newly manufactured paper products. As an example, bisphenol A (a chemical commonly found in thermal paper) has been verified as a contaminant in a variety of paper products resulting from paper recycling. Groups of chemicals as phthalates, phenols, mineral oils, polychlorinated biphenyls (PCBs) and toxic metals have all been identified in paper material. Although several measures might reduce the chemical load in paper recycling (e.g., improved decontamination, optimized collection of paper for recycling), even completely terminating the use of a particular chemical (phase-out) might still result in its circulation in the paper cycle for decades.

See also

 Deinked pulp cardboard
 Paper
 Tree-free paper
 Wood-free paper
 Environmental impact of paper
 USPS Post Office Box Lobby Recycling program

References

External links

 
 U.S. Environmental Protection Agency: Paper and Paperboard Products
 How to Make Recycled Paper – A tutorial for making your own recycled paper
 Waste Paper Recycling – How Paper Recycling works?

 
Water conservation
Forest conservation
Recycling by material
Energy conservation